Bull Harbour is a settlement in British Columbia.
Bull Harbour is a settlement on Hope Island, British Columbia, Canada, with an estimated population of 2-20 people.

The name Bull Harbour has been in use since at least 1841.  The name likely comes from the large and fierce sea lions that frequent the area.

Climate

References

Settlements in British Columbia